Loftus is a masculine given name. Notable people with the name include:

 Loftus Armstrong (1878–1959), New Zealand rugby union player
 Loftus Becker, American law professor
 Loftus Henry Bland (1805–1872), Irish barrister and Member of Parliament
 Loftus Jones (1879–1916), British Royal Navy commander awarded the Victoria Cross
 Loftus William Otway (1775–1854), British Army general
 Loftus Perkins (1834–1891), English engineer
 Loftus Dudley Ward (1905–1980), Canadian politician and Royal Canadian Navy chief petty officer
 Loftus Wigram (1803–1889), British barrister, businessman and Member of Parliament

English-language masculine given names